ISO 3166-2:PK is the entry for Pakistan in ISO 3166-2, part of the ISO 3166 standard published by the International Organization for Standardization (ISO), which defines codes for the names of the principal subdivisions (e.g., provinces or states) of all countries coded in ISO 3166-1.

Currently for Pakistan, ISO 3166-2 codes are defined for 1 federal capital territory, 4 provinces, and 2 Pakistan administered areas. The Islamabad Capital Territory contains the capital of the country Islamabad and has special status equal to the provinces and territory.

Each code consists of two parts, separated by a hyphen. The second part is two letters.

Current codes
Subdivision names are listed as in the ISO 3166-2 standard published by the ISO 3166 Maintenance Agency (ISO 3166/MA).

ISO 639-1 codes are used to represent subdivision names in the following administrative languages:
 (en): English
 (ur): Urdu

Click on the button in the header to sort each column.

Former codes

Changes
The following changes to the entry have been announced in newsletters by the ISO 3166/MA since the first publication of ISO 3166-2 in 1998:

See also
 Administrative units of Pakistan
 FIPS region codes of Pakistan

External links
 ISO Online Browsing Platform: PK
 Provinces of Pakistan, Statoids.com

2:PK
ISO 3166-2
Administrative units of Pakistan-related lists
Pakistan geography-related lists